HNLMS O 7 was a unique patrol submarine of the Royal Netherlands Navy for use in the home waters of Europe. The ship was built by the Maatschappij Fijenoord shipyard in Rotterdam. The submarines diving depth was 40 metres.  was very similar to the O 7 and they are sometimes regarded as one class.

Service history
The submarine was ordered on 8 May 1913. On 12 May 1914 the O 7 was  laid down in  Rotterdam at the shipyard of Maatschappij Fijenoord. The 0 7's launching took place on 22 July 1916 and on 23 December 1916 the ship was commissioned into the Royal Netherlands Navy.

On the 18 May 1927 the 0 7 and Swedish steamer Scania collided off the coast of Texel.

From 1935 onwards the ship was used only as a training vessel until 21 December 1936, when the O 7 was decommissioned and sold for scrapping.

World War II
In 1940 when the Germans invaded the Netherlands the 0 7 was captured, but it was considered to be far too obsolete for it to be of any use in the war effort.
The O 7 sank on 2 May 1944 in Den Helder while it was moored there, she sank because of water leaking into the ship. After the war she was raised and finally scrapped.

References

Bibliography

External links
Description of ship

1916 ships
Ships built in Rotterdam
Submarines of the Royal Netherlands Navy
Submarines built by Maatschappij voor Scheeps- en Werktuigbouw Fijenoord